The Family Law Act 1986 is an Act of the United Kingdom parliament. It covered a range of issues, including e.g. access to children. One obscure point is that it abolished Jactitation of marriage.

Family law in the United Kingdom
United Kingdom Acts of Parliament 1986